Neuroma cutis is a relatively rare type of neuroma, or tumor involving nervous tissue, in the skin. There are three types of true neuromas of the skin and mucous membranes known to exist: traumatic neuromas, multiple mucosal neuromas, and solitary palisaded encapsulated neuromas.

See also
Skin lesion

References

Dermal and subcutaneous growths